The 1991–92 South Western Football League season was the 41st in the history of South Western League. The league consisted of 18 teams.

League table

The division featured 18 teams, 17 from last season and 1 new team:
 Devon & Cornwall Police

References

9